AmBank Tower  is the 41st tallest skyscraper in Malaysia. The tower is located in Jalan Yap Kwan Seng; merely 0.05 km from the Kuala Lumpur City Centre. The tower was officially launched by the fourth Prime Minister of Malaysia, Mahathir Mohamad in 2003. It also has an  antenna on the top of the building. The tower houses the headquarters of AmBank Group.

Tenants
Besides AmBank, the tower also houses notable tenants such as Acer Sales and Services and Mongoose Publishing (Malaysia).

See also
List of tallest buildings in Kuala Lumpur
AmBank

References

Skyscraper office buildings in Kuala Lumpur
Office buildings completed in 1998
1998 establishments in Malaysia
Postmodern architecture in Malaysia